Neil or Neal Adams may refer to:

Sports
Neil Adams (judoka) (born 1958), British judoka
Neil Adams (footballer) (born 1965), English footballer
Neil Adams (ice hockey) (born 1982), English ice hockey player
Neil Adams (rugby) on List of Australia national rugby union players
Neil Adams (rugby union) from Newcastle and Hunter Rugby Union

Others
Neil Adams (director) on List of Mile High episodes

See also
Neal Adams (1941–2022), American comic book artist
O'Neal Adams (1919–1998), American football and basketball player
Neil Adam (disambiguation)
Adams (surname)